F. B. McFarren Memorial Park is a park in the community of Streetsville in Mississauga, Ontario, Canada.

References 

Municipal parks in Ontario
Protected areas of the Regional Municipality of Peel
Tourist attractions in Mississauga